Albirhodobacter is a bacterial genus from the family of Rhodobacteraceae.

References

Further reading
 
 

Rhodobacteraceae
Bacteria genera